Matteo Furlan (born 29 May 1989) is an Italian swimmer.

Furlan is an athlete of the Gruppo Sportivo della Marina Militare.

He competed in the 25 km open water event at the 2018 European Aquatics Championships, winning the bronze medal.

References

External links
 

1989 births
Living people
Italian male swimmers
Italian male freestyle swimmers
European Aquatics Championships medalists in swimming
Italian male long-distance swimmers
Mediterranean Games bronze medalists for Italy
Mediterranean Games medalists in swimming
Swimmers at the 2013 Mediterranean Games
Universiade medalists in swimming
Universiade gold medalists for Italy
Swimmers of Marina Militare
Medalists at the 2013 Summer Universiade
Medalists at the 2015 Summer Universiade
People from San Vito al Tagliamento
Sportspeople from Friuli-Venezia Giulia
20th-century Italian people
21st-century Italian people